The 2016 CollegeInsider.com Postseason Tournament (CIT) was a postseason single-elimination tournament of 26 NCAA Division I basketball teams. The first round was played March 14–16, 2016. The second round March 18–20, Quarterfinals March 22–24 the semifinals March 27, and the championship game was played on March 29

Participants who belonged to "mid-major" conferences, not invited to the 2016 NCAA Tournament, National Invitation Tournament, College Basketball Invitational or the Vegas 16 made up the field.  An experimental rule allowing players six personal fouls instead of five was used in all 2016 national postseason tournaments except for the NCAA Tournament.

Originally set to include 32 teams, the 2016 tournament consisted of 26 participants. After all 26 teams played in the first round, the top-three highest rated teams based on the Pomeroy College Basketball Ratings regular season rating automatically advanced to the quarterfinals.

Columbia beat UC Irvine 73–67 in the championship game to give the Ivy League just its second postseason tournament title in conference history (Princeton won the 1975 NIT).

Participating teams
The following teams received an invitation to the 2016 CIT:

Format
The CIT uses the old NIT model in which there is no set bracket. Future round opponents are determined by the results of the previous round. After all 26 teams played in the first round, the top-three highest rated teams based on the Pomeroy College Basketball Ratings regular season rating automatically advanced to the quarterfinals.

Coach John McLendon Classic
The Coach John McLendon Classic was televised March 14, on CBS Sports Network as part of the CIT. The Classic will feature at least one historically black college/university.  The winner of the John McLendon Classic advanced to the second round of the CIT. This will be the first time in NCAA Division I Basketball history, that a "Classic" has been part of a postseason tournament. Previously the John McLendon Classic was played during the regular season.

Schedule

Bracket
Bracket is for visual purposes only. The CIT does not have a set bracket.

Home teams listed second.
* Denotes overtime period.

References

CollegeInsider.com
CollegeInsider.com Postseason Tournament